Mocanaqua is an unincorporated community and census-designated place (CDP) in Conyngham Township, Luzerne County, Pennsylvania, United States. The population was 646 at the 2010 census.

Geography
It is located on the east bank of the Susquehanna River along PA 239, which crosses the river and links Mocanaqua to the borough of Shickshinny.

Demographics

School District
Students attend the Greater Nanticoke Area School District.

Gallery

References

Census-designated places in Luzerne County, Pennsylvania
Census-designated places in Pennsylvania